The 2015 New York Mets season was the 54th season in the franchises' history. The Mets finished the regular season with a record of 90–72, winning the National League East title on September 26, their first division title since 2006 and sixth overall. They defeated the Los Angeles Dodgers in the Division Series in five games and swept the Chicago Cubs in the National League Championship Series. They lost to the Kansas City Royals in five games in the 2015 World Series. It was the Mets' first appearance in the World Series since 2000 when they lost to the New York Yankees. It marked the team's first winning season since Citi Field opened in 2009 (and their first since 2008, their last season at Citi Field's predecessor, Shea Stadium).

Offseason
On November 10, 2014, the Mets signed Michael Cuddyer to a two-year $21 million deal. 
On December 2, 2014, the Mets  officially non-tendered Eric Young Jr.
On December 11, 2014, the Mets agreed to a one-year contract with John Mayberry Jr.

Spring training
During spring training, the Mets made trades for relief pitchers Jerry Blevins from the Washington Nationals and Alex Torres from the San Diego Padres.

Regular season

Opening Day

On Opening Day, the Mets faced the Washington Nationals, whose starting pitcher Max Scherzer held the Mets hitless until the 6th inning. The Mets capitalized on two errors by Washington in the 6th inning: Ian Desmond committed a throwing error and Dan Uggla dropped a David Wright pop-up, and Lucas Duda finished off the rally with a two-run single into the right-center gap off a 98-MPH fastball from Scherzer. Mets starter Bartolo Colón allowed only a solo home run to Bryce Harper. After Colon left the game, Buddy Carlyle, filling in for an injured Jenrry Mejía, earned the save, giving the Mets a 3–1 victory.

April
After their opening series in Washington, former closer Jenrry Mejía was suspended 80 games for the use of stanozolol, a performance-enhancing drug (PED) banned by Major League Baseball. The Mets lost three of their first five games. After losing the first two in Atlanta to start their second series, the Mets began an 11-game win streak that started with Colón picking up his second win. The Mets then returned home, and swept the Philadelphia Phillies, Miami Marlins, and Atlanta Braves. On April 23, 2015 the New York Mets beat the Braves 6–3 to complete a perfect 10 game homestand, tying their start to the 1986 season with a 13–3 record and tying the team record with an 11-game winning streak. During the eighth game of the season, David Wright pulled his hamstring while stealing a base. He left the game and Anthony Recker was brought in to play third base. After a number of weeks, Wright was diagnosed with spinal stenosis, raising questions as to whether the captain could ever return. During the 11 game winning streak, catcher Travis d'Arnaud was hit by a pitch, leading to a wrist injury. Kevin Plawecki was called up to replace d'Arnaud. In the same game, relief pitcher Jerry Blevins was hit by a line drive, breaking his arm. Their winning streak was broken in the first game of the Subway Series, where Jacob deGrom lost to Michael Pineda. The next day, in the second game of the series, Matt Harvey pitched 8.2 innings, but after giving up back-to-back hits, Harvey was taken out of the game. He would still get the victory. No Met would pitch a complete game until September. The Mets then lost the rubber match against the Yankees, their first appearance on ESPN Sunday Night Baseball since the 2013 season.

May
In May, the Nationals took the Division lead after taking three of four games from the Mets at Citi Field to start the month. Bartolo Colón saw his ERA increase to 4.80 at one point, effectively ending his All-Star chances. Noah Syndergaard was called up in mid-May and made his Major League debut on May 12 against the Chicago Cubs. He lost 6–1 in part of a four-game sweep by the Cubs at Wrigley Field. The Mets then returned home for a weekend series against the Milwaukee Brewers, winning two games to one. On Saturday, the Mets scored 14 runs, scoring 10 in the 4th inning, which included a grand slam hit by Wilmer Flores. Syndergaard picked up his first major league win on Sunday as the Mets won 5–1. In the following week, they split a four-game series with the Cardinals and were swept by the Pirates. While they started the final week of May by sweeping the Phillies, they closed the month by losing a series to the Marlins, ending May with a 28–23 record.

June
The Mets lost a series in San Diego and also split a series in Arizona. Returning home, they were no-hit by Chris Heston on June 9, which would turn out to be the first of two no-hitters thrown against the Mets in 2015. New York rebounded to win a weekend series against the Braves, and also snapped the Toronto Blue Jays' 11 game winning streak, which matched the Mets' 11-game streak as the longest winning streak of the year, by beating them on a walk-off hit by Wilmer Flores. After another win the following day, the Mets retook the division lead again. They then lost their next seven games in a row to fall back to under .500, at 36–37. Facing the Brewers, Jacob deGrom ended the losing streak by pitching 8 shutout innings to guide the Mets to a 2–0 victory and get them back to .500 returning home for a three-game set with the Cincinnati Reds.

On June 28, left-handed pitching prospect Steven Matz, a native of Stony Brook, New York and a lifelong Mets fan, made his Major League debut for the Mets against the Cincinnati Reds. He recorded four runs batted in (RBIs), breaking the Mets' franchise record for RBIs in a major league debut and setting an MLB record for most RBI by a pitcher in their debut. He went on to get the win in that game. Matz was the first pitcher from Long Island to make his MLB debut with the Mets since Ray Searage in 1981. With the win, the Mets swept the Reds to end June with a 40–38 record.

July
The Mets opened July by getting swept by the Chicago Cubs at Citi Field. In the three-game series, the Mets scored only one run. The team lost 6–1 on Thursday afternoon to drop to 40–40. After the game, local news pundits tore into the Wilpon's ownership of the team and GM Sandy Alderson not admitting there was a problem with the offense. Alderson then addressed the media and dubbed the reporters "residents of Panic City". Panic City became a popular term referring to Mets fans, especially on social media.  After the sweep, the Mets went 4–2 on a road trip to the west coast in Los Angeles and San Francisco. They followed this with a sweep of the Arizona Diamondbacks at Citi Field that brought the team's record to 47–42 heading into the 2015 All Star Break. In the final game of this series, Kirk Nieuwenhuis became the tenth Met to hit three home runs in one game, and the first player in Mets history to hit three home runs in one home game; the previous nine did so on the road.

On July 29, the Mets were involved in a bizarre series of events where it was reported through various social media outlets that Wilmer Flores had been traded, along with Zack Wheeler to the Milwaukee Brewers in exchange for outfielder Carlos Gómez, as part of the Mets' desire to bring in an outfield bat. Word spread quickly around the stadium, and eventually to Flores, who took the field in the 8th inning crying and visibly emotional. After the game, general manager Sandy Alderson confirmed with the media that the trade had fallen through due to either medical concerns or disagreements on money, meaning Flores and Wheeler remained Mets. The next day, Flores was on the bench while the Mets tried to put the previous night behind them, leading the Padres 7–1 in the 7th inning. However, Derek Norris cut into the lead with a grand slam off Hansel Robles, but the newly acquired reliever Tyler Clippard sent the game into the 9th with the Mets retaining a 7–5 lead. Jeurys Familia came in to close the game, but with two outs and one strike on Norris, a heavy rainfall prompted the umpires to delay the game. After the delay, Norris blooped an 0–2 single to right field, Matt Kemp grounded a single to left field, and Justin Upton provided the final blow, homering to give the Padres an 8–7 lead, which would hold up.

Following the defeat, the Mets faced the Washington Nationals in a three-game series. The Nationals were three games ahead of the Mets, and a New York sweep could give the Mets the division lead. Prior to the first game, the Mets acquired outfielder Yoenis Céspedes, in a trade with the Tigers for minor league pitchers Michael Fulmer and Luis Cessa. That night, Flores hit a walk-off home run in the 12th inning, winning the game for the Mets by a score of 2–1. Flores had also driven in the other Mets run earlier in the game. It was also the only walk-off home run the Mets hit that season.

August
The Mets started August by sweeping the Washington Nationals and the Miami Marlins. They regained the lead in the NL East on August 3 and did not relinquish it for the rest of the season. On August 21, Céspedes became the 11th Met in franchise history and the third Met in 2015 to hit three home runs in a game when he did so against the Rockies. This feat was achieved early in the season by Lucas Duda and Kirk Nieuwenhuis.

On August 24 against the Phillies, David Wright played in his first game since April 14, having missed over four months due to a hamstring injury and a career-threatening bout of spinal stenosis. Wright hit a home run into the second deck in his first at-bat; this would be the first of eight Met home runs in the game, setting a new franchise record in their 16–7 win. The Mets also hit 45 home runs in August, setting the club record for most home runs in a calendar month.

The Mets finished the month of August with a 20–8 record, their first month with at least 20 wins since September 2000.

September
The Mets swept a three-game series in Washington against the Nationals, coming from behind in each game to do so; this sweep increased their division lead, which they would not relinquish, to seven games, effectively ending the chances of a Nationals comeback.

On September 26, the Mets clinched the National League East Division regular season championship after defeating the Cincinnati Reds 10–2.

October
The Mets were the favorites to earn a home-field advantage over the Los Angeles Dodgers in the Divisional Series, but finished 1–5 to end the season. This included being swept by the Phillies and dropping a series against the Nationals, which included a no-hitter thrown by Max Scherzer on October 3, which was the second no-hitter thrown against the Mets all season. The next day, however, the Mets won 1–0. Jacob deGrom pitched 4 shutout innings and the Mets took a combined no-hitter into the 8th, but Clint Robinson singled off Jon Niese to end the no-hitter. Curtis Granderson then homered for the only run of the game, and Jeurys Familia earned his 43rd save of the year, tying a club record previously held by Armando Benitez, who recorded 43 saves in 2001. The win also gave the Mets 90 victories, which Alderson had predicted of the team in 2014. The club ended the regular season with a record of 90–72, making it the first time since 2006 that the Mets won at least 90 games.

The Mets played the Los Angeles Dodgers in the 2015 National League Division Series, winning in five games. Second baseman Daniel Murphy hit three home runs in the series. The Mets then swept the Chicago Cubs in the 2015 National League Championship Series. Murphy was named the NLCS Most Valuable Player, after he batted .529 in the series and homered in each of the 4 games, bringing his consecutive postseason game home run streak to six games, an MLB postseason record. Murphy homered a total of seven times in the two series. The Mets would lose in five games to the Kansas City Royals in the 2015 World Series. It was the first World Series to feature two expansion teams established after 1960. Game 5 was the first game in Mets franchise history to occur in the month of November.

The 2015 World Series was the only time in the 2010s decade that a New York City team played in a World Series; the Yankees didn't reach the World Series during the decade.

Detailed record

Most Runs Scored in a game: 16 (8/24 vs. PHI)
Most Runs Allowed in a game: 14 (9/1 vs. PHI)
Most Hits in a Game: 21 (7/25 vs. LAD)
Longest Winning Streak: 11 games (4/12–4/23) Ties franchise record
Longest Losing Streak: 7 games (6/17–6/24)

Season standings

National League East

National League Division Leaders

Record vs. opponents

Game log

Regular season

|-  style="text-align:center; background:#cfc"
| 1 || April 6 || @Nationals || 3–1 || Bartolo Colón (1–0) || Max Scherzer (0–1) || Buddy Carlyle (1) || Nationals Park (42,295) || 1–0
|-  style="text-align:center; background:#fcc"
| 2 || April 8 || @Nationals || 1–2 || Jordan Zimmermann (1–0) || Jacob deGrom (0–1) || Drew Storen (1) || Nationals Park (25,999) || 1–1
|-  style="text-align:center; background:#cfc"
| 3 || April 9 || @Nationals || 6–3 || Matt Harvey (1–0) || Stephen Strasburg (0–1) ||  || Nationals Park (25,327) || 2–1
|-  style="text-align:center; background:#fcc"
| 4 || April 10 || @Braves || 3–5 || Jim Johnson (1–0) || Rafael Montero (0–1) || Jason Grilli (3) || Turner Field (46,279) || 2–2
|-  style="text-align:center; background:#fcc" 
| 5 || April 11 || @Braves || 3–5 || Julio Teherán (2–0) || Dillon Gee (0–1) || Jim Johnson (1) || Turner Field (36,056) || 2–3
|-  style="text-align:center; background:#cfc"
| 6 || April 12 || @Braves || 4–3 || Bartolo Colón (2–0) || Juan Jaime (0–1) || Jeurys Familia (1) || Turner Field (28,192) || 3–3
|-  style="text-align:center; background:#cfc"
| 7 || April 13 || Phillies || 2–0 || Jacob deGrom (1–1) || Aaron Harang (1–1) || Jeurys Familia (2) || Citi Field (43,947) || 4–3
|-  style="text-align:center; background:#cfc"
| 8 || April 14 || Phillies || 6–5 || Matt Harvey (2–0) || David Buchanan (0–2) || Jeurys Familia (3) || Citi Field (39,489) || 5–3
|-  style="text-align:center; background:#cfc"
| 9 || April 15 || Phillies || 6–1 || Jon Niese (1–0) || Jerome Williams (0–1) ||  || Citi Field (21,052) || 6–3
|-  style="text-align:center; background:#cfc"
| 10 || April 16 || Marlins || 7–5 || Jerry Blevins (1–0) || Mike Dunn (0–1) || Jeurys Familia (4) || Citi Field (20,556) || 7–3
|-  style="text-align:center; background:#cfc"
| 11 || April 17 || Marlins || 4–1 || Bartolo Colón (3–0) || Brad Hand (0–1) || Jeurys Familia (5) || Citi Field (38,753) || 8–3
|-  style="text-align:center; background:#cfc"
| 12 || April 18 || Marlins || 5–4 || Jacob deGrom (2–1) || Mat Latos (0–3) || Alex Torres (1) || Citi Field (41,844) || 9–3
|-  style="text-align:center; background:#cfc"
| 13 || April 19 || Marlins || 7–6 || Matt Harvey (3–0) || Tom Koehler (1–2) || Jeurys Familia (6) || Citi Field (41,234) || 10–3
|-  style="text-align:center; background:#cfc"
| 14 || April 21 || Braves || 7–1 || Jon Niese (2–0) || Trevor Cahill (0–2) ||  || Citi Field (21,033) || 11–3
|-  style="text-align:center; background:#cfc"
| 15 || April 22 || Braves || 3–2 || Buddy Carlyle (1–0) || Jim Johnson (1–1) || Jeurys Familia (7) || Citi Field (20,971) || 12–3
|-  style="text-align:center; background:#cfc"
| 16 || April 23 || Braves || 6–3 || Bartolo Colón (4–0) || Julio Teherán (2–1) || Jeurys Familia (8) || Citi Field (23,980) || 13–3
|-  style="text-align:center; background:#fcc"
| 17 || April 24 || @Yankees || 1–6 || Michael Pineda (3–0) || Jacob deGrom (2–2) ||  || Yankee Stadium (45,310) || 13–4
|-  style="text-align:center; background:#cfc"
| 18 || April 25 || @Yankees || 8–2 || Matt Harvey (4–0) || CC Sabathia (0–4) ||  || Yankee Stadium (47,909) || 14–4
|-  style="text-align:center; background:#fcc"
| 19 || April 26 || @Yankees || 4–6 || Chasen Shreve (1–0) || Jon Niese (2–1) || Andrew Miller (7) || Yankee Stadium (47,510) || 14–5 
|-  style="text-align:center; background:#cfc"
| 20 || April 27 || @Marlins || 3–1 || Carlos Torres (1–0) || Steve Cishek (0–1)  || Jeurys Familia (9)  || Marlins Park (18,547) || 15–5
|-  style="text-align:center; background:#fcc"
| 21 || April 28 || @Marlins || 3–4  || Bryan Morris (3–0) || Carlos Torres (1–1) || Steve Cishek (2) || Marlins Park (17,255) || 15–6
|-  style="text-align:center; background:#fcc"
| 22 || April 29 || @Marlins || 3–4 || Sam Dyson (1–0) || Bartolo Colón (4–1) ||  || Marlins Park (17,076) || 15–7
|-  style="text-align:center; background:#fcc"
| 23 || April 30 || Nationals ||2–8 || Stephen Strasburg (2–2) || Jacob deGrom (2–3)  ||  || Citi Field (21,689) || 15–8
|-

|-  style="text-align:center; background:#cfc"
| 24 || May 1 || Nationals || 4–0 || Matt Harvey (5–0) || Max Scherzer (1–3) || Jeurys Familia (10) || Citi Field (33,178) || 16–8
|-  style="text-align:center; background:#fcc"
| 25 || May 2 || Nationals || 0–1 || Gio González (2–2) || Jon Niese (2–2) || Drew Storen (6) || Citi Field (39,730) || 16–9
|-  style="text-align:center; background:#fcc"
| 26 || May 3 || Nationals || 0–1 || Doug Fister (2–1) || Dillon Gee (0–2) || Drew Storen (7)  || Citi Field (41,048) || 16–10
|-  style="text-align:center; background:#cfc"
| 27 || May 5 || Orioles || 3–2 || Bartolo Colón (5–1) || Bud Norris (1–3) || Jeurys Familia (11) || Citi Field (20,534) || 17–10
|-  style="text-align:center; background:#cfc"
| 28 || May 6 || Orioles || 5–1 || Jacob deGrom (3–3) || Ubaldo Jiménez (2–2)  ||  || Citi Field (21,667) || 18–10
|-  style="text-align:center; background:#fcc"
| 29 || May 8 || @Phillies || 1−3 || Cole Hamels (2−3) || Matt Harvey (5−1) || Jonathan Papelbon (6) || Citizens Bank Park (32,734) || 18–11
|-  style="text-align:center; background:#cfc"
| 30 || May 9 || @Phillies || 3−2 || Jon Niese (3−2) || Aaron Harang (3−3) || Jeurys Familia (12) || Citizens Bank Park (29,373) || 19–11
|-  style="text-align:center; background:#cfc"
| 31 || May 10 || @Phillies || 7–4 || Bartolo Colón (6–1) || Chad Billingsley (0–2) || Jeurys Familia (13) || Citizens Bank Park (27,935) || 20–11
|-  style="text-align:center; background:#fcc"
| 32 || May 11 || @Cubs || 3–4 || Jon Lester (3–2)  || Jacob deGrom (3–4) || Héctor Rondón (7) || Wrigley Field (32,980) || 20–12
|-  style="text-align:center; background:#fcc"
| 33 || May 12 || @Cubs || 1–6 || Jake Arrieta (3–2) || Noah Syndergaard (0–1) ||  || Wrigley Field (31,542) || 20–13
|-  style="text-align:center; background:#fcc"
| 34 || May 13 || @Cubs || 1–2 || Héctor Rondón (2–0) || Carlos Torres (1–2) ||  || Wrigley Field (33,709) || 20–14
|-  style="text-align:center; background:#fcc"
| 35 || May 14 || @Cubs || 5–6 || Pedro Strop (1–2) || Jon Niese (3−3) || Héctor Rondón (8) || Wrigley Field (31,496) || 20–15
|-  style="text-align:center; background:#fcc"
| 36 || May 15 || Brewers || 0–7 || Kyle Lohse (3–4) || Bartolo Colón (6–2) ||  || Citi Field (27,554) || 20–16
|-  style="text-align:center; background:#cfc"
| 37 || May 16 || Brewers || 14–1  || Jacob deGrom (4–4) || Matt Garza (2–5) ||  || Citi Field (30,208) || 21–16
|-  style="text-align:center; background:#cfc"
| 38 || May 17 || Brewers || 5–1 || Noah Syndergaard (1–1) || Wily Peralta (1–5) ||  || Citi Field (32,422) || 22–16
|-  style="text-align:center; background:#cfc"
| 39 || May 18 || Cardinals || 2–1 (14)  || Carlos Torres (2–2) || Sam Tuivailala (0–1) ||  || Citi Field (23,338) || 23–16
|-  style="text-align:center; background:#fcc"
| 40 || May 19 || Cardinals || 2–10 || Michael Wacha (6–0) || Jon Niese (3−4) ||  || Citi Field (21,157) || 23–17
|-  style="text-align:center; background:#fcc"
| 41 || May 20 || Cardinals || 0–9 || Carlos Martínez (4–2) || Bartolo Colón (6–3) ||  || Citi Field (23,726)  || 23–18
|-  style="text-align:center; background:#cfc"
| 42 || May 21 || Cardinals || 5–0 || Jacob deGrom (5–4) || Jaime García (0–1)  ||  || Citi Field (32,783) || 24–18
|-  style="text-align:center; background:#fcc"
| 43 || May 22 || @Pirates || 1–4 || Gerrit Cole (6–2) || Noah Syndergaard (1–2) || Mark Melancon (10) || PNC Park (33,337) || 24–19
|-  style="text-align:center; background:#fcc"
| 44 || May 23 || @Pirates || 2–8  || A. J. Burnett (4–1) || Matt Harvey (5–2) ||  || PNC Park (39,385) || 24–20
|-  style="text-align:center; background:#fcc"
| 45 || May 24 || @Pirates || 1–9 || Francisco Liriano (2–4) || Jon Niese (3−5) ||  || PNC Park (37,784) || 24–21
|-  style="text-align:center; background:#cfc"
| 46 || May 25 || Phillies || 6–3 || Bartolo Colón (7–3) ||  Elvis Araújo (1–1)  || Jeurys Familia (14) || Citi Field (30,946) || 25–21
|-  style="text-align:center; background:#cfc"
| 47 || May 26 || Phillies || 5–4 (10) || Jeurys Familia (1–0) || Jeanmar Gómez (0–1) ||  || Citi Field (21,064) || 26–21
|-  style="text-align:center; background:#cfc"
| 48 || May 27 || Phillies || 7–0 || Noah Syndergaard (2–2) || Sean O'Sullivan  (1–4) ||  || Citi Field (24,406) || 27–21
|-  style="text-align:center; background:#fcc"
| 49 || May 29 || Marlins || 3–4 || Dan Haren (5–2) || Matt Harvey (5–3) || A. J. Ramos (3) || Citi Field (33,880) || 27–22
|-  style="text-align:center; background:#fcc"
| 50 || May 30 || Marlins || 5–9 || Mike Dunn (1–3) || Hansel Robles (0–1) || A. J. Ramos (4) || Citi Field (39,095) || 27–23
|-  style="text-align:center; background:#cfc"
| 51 || May 31 || Marlins || 4–3 || Bartolo Colón (8–3) ||  Steve Cishek (1–5) || Jeurys Familia (15)  || Citi Field (28,711) || 28–23
|-

|-  style="text-align:center; background:#cfc"
| 52 || June 1 || @Padres || 7–0  || Jacob deGrom (6–4) || Andrew Cashner (2–8) ||  || Petco Park (21,893) || 29–23
|-  style="text-align:center; background:#fcc"
| 53 || June 2 || @Padres || 2–7 || Ian Kennedy (3–5) || Noah Syndergaard (2–3)  ||  || Petco Park (22,264) || 29–24
|-  style="text-align:center; background:#fcc"
| 54 || June 3 || @Padres || 3–7 || James Shields (7–0) || Dillon Gee (0–3) ||  || Petco Park (24,398) || 29–25
|-  style="text-align:center; background:#cfc"
| 55 || June 4 || @Diamondbacks || 6–2 || Matt Harvey (6–3) || Dominic Leone (0–5) || Jeurys Familia (16) || Chase Field (18,954) || 30–25
|-  style="text-align:center; background:#fcc"
| 56 || June 5 || @Diamondbacks || 2–7 || Jeremy Hellickson (4–3) || Jon Niese (3–6) ||  || Chase Field (24,332) || 30–26
|-  style="text-align:center; background:#fcc"
| 57 || June 6 || @Diamondbacks || 1–2 || Randall Delgado (3–2) || Bartolo Colón (8–4) || Brad Ziegler (7) || Chase Field (30,265) || 30–27
|-  style="text-align:center; background:#cfc"
| 58 || June 7 || @Diamondbacks || 6–3  || Jacob deGrom (7–4) || Josh Collmenter (3–6) || Jeurys Familia (17)  || Chase Field (31,575) || 31–27
|-  style="text-align:center; background:#fcc"
| 59 || June 9 || Giants || 0–5 || Chris Heston (6–4) || Noah Syndergaard (2–4) ||  || Citi Field (23,155) || 31–28
|-  style="text-align:center; background:#fcc"
| 60 || June 10 || Giants || 5–8 || Tim Hudson (4–5)  || Matt Harvey (6–4) || Santiago Casilla (18) || Citi Field (24,436) || 31–29
|-  style="text-align:center; background:#cfc"
| 61 || June 11 || Giants || 5–4 || Jeurys Familia (2–0)  || Sergio Romo (0–3) ||  || Citi Field (25,143) || 32–29
|-  style="text-align:center; background:#cfc"
| 62 || June 12 || Braves || 5–3 || Bartolo Colón (9–4) || Alex Wood (4–4) || Jeurys Familia (18) || Citi Field (32,554) || 33–29
|-  style="text-align:center; background:#fcc"
| 63 || June 13 || Braves || 3–5  (11) || Jason Grilli (2–2) || Carlos Torres (2–3) || Williams Pérez (1) || Citi Field (37,734) || 33–30
|-  style="text-align:center; background:#cfc"
| 64 || June 14 || Braves || 10–8 || Sean Gilmartin (1–0) || Luis Avilán (2–2) || Jeurys Familia (19) || Citi Field (36,340) || 34–30
|-  style="text-align:center; background:#cfc"
| 65 || June 15 || Blue Jays || 4–3 (11) || Hansel Robles (1–1) || Brett Cecil (1–3)  ||  || Citi Field (22,172) || 35–30
|-  style="text-align:center; background:#cfc"
| 66 || June 16 || Blue Jays || 3–2 || Matt Harvey (7–4) || Scott Copeland (1–1) || Bobby Parnell (1) || Citi Field (24,522) || 36–30
|-  style="text-align:center; background:#fcc"
| 67 || June 17 || @Blue Jays || 0–8  || Drew Hutchison (6–1) || Jonathon Niese (3–7)  ||  || Rogers Centre (28,906) || 36–31
|-  style="text-align:center; background:#fcc"
| 68 || June 18 || @Blue Jays || 1–7  || R. A. Dickey (3–6)  || Bartolo Colón (9–5)  ||   || Rogers Centre (27,588) || 36–32
|-  style="text-align:center; background:#fcc"
| 69 || June 19 || @Braves || 1–2  || Matt Wisler (1–0)  || Jacob deGrom (7–5)  || Jason Grilli (19)  || Turner Field (28,853) || 36–33
|-  style="text-align:center; background:#fcc" 
| 70 || June 20 || @Braves ||  4–6   || Williams Perez (4–0)  || Jack Leathersich (0–1) || Jason Grilli (20)  || Turner Field (40,733) || 36–34
|-  style="text-align:center; background:#fcc"
| 71 || June 21 || @Braves || 0–1   || Julio Teherán (5–3) || Matt Harvey (7–5) || Jim Johnson (4) || Turner Field (30,268) || 36–35
|-  style="text-align:center; background:#fcc"
| 72 || June 23 || @Brewers || 2–3 || Will Smith (3–0) || Hansel Robles (1–2)  || Francisco Rodríguez (14)  || Miller Park (25,055) || 36–36
|-  style="text-align:center; background:#fcc"
| 73 || June 24 || @Brewers || 1–4 || Jimmy Nelson (4–8) || Bartolo Colón (9–6) || Francisco Rodríguez (15) || Miller Park (22,017) || 36–37
|-  style="text-align:center; background:#cfc"
| 74 || June 25 || @Brewers || 2–0 || Jacob deGrom (8–5) || Michael Blazek (4–2) || Jeurys Familia (20) || Miller Park (33,354) || 37–37
|-  style="text-align:center; background:#cfc"
| 75 || June 26 || Reds || 2–1 || Noah Syndergaard (3–4) || Johnny Cueto (4–5) || Jeurys Familia (21) || Citi Field (28,109) || 38–37
|-  style="text-align:center; background:#cfc"
| 76 || June 27 || Reds || 2–1 (13) || Bobby Parnell (1–0) || Nate Adcock (0–1) ||  || Citi Field (32,531) || 39–37
|-  style="text-align:center; background:#cfc"
| 77 || June 28 || Reds || 7–2 || Steven Matz (1–0) || Josh Smith (0–1) ||  || Citi Field (29,640) || 40–37
|-  style="text-align:center; background:#fcc"
| 78 || June 30 || Cubs || 0–1 || Kyle Hendricks (3–4) || Jonathon Niese (3–8) || Jason Motte (3) || Citi Field (27,084) || 40–38
|-

|-  style="text-align:center; background:#fcc"
| 79 || July 1 || Cubs || 0–2 || Jason Motte (6–1) || Carlos Torres (2–4) || Justin Grimm (1)  || Citi Field (23,906) || 40–39
|-  style="text-align:center; background:#fcc"
| 80 || July 2 || Cubs || 1–6 || Jake Arrieta (8–5) || Jacob deGrom (8–6) ||  || Citi Field (27,207) || 40–40
|-  style="text-align:center; background:#cfc"
| 81 || July 3 || @Dodgers ||  2–1 || Hansel Robles (2–2) || Kenley Jansen (2–1) || Jeurys Familia (22) || Dodger Stadium (52,570) || 41–40
|-  style="text-align:center; background:#fcc"
| 82 || July 4 || @Dodgers || 3–4 || Zack Greinke (7–2) || Matt Harvey (7–6) || J.P. Howell (1) || Dodger Stadium (51,252) || 41–41
|-  style="text-align:center; background:#cfc"
| 83 || July 5 || @Dodgers || 8–0 || Steven Matz (2–0) || Mike Bolsinger (4–3) || Logan Verrett (1) || Dodger Stadium (40,027) || 42–41
|-  style="text-align:center; background:#cfc"
| 84 || July 6 || @Giants || 3–0 || Jon Niese (4–8) || Sergio Romo (0–4) || Jeurys Familia (23) || AT&T Park (42,247) || 43–41
|-  style="text-align:center; background:#fcc"
| 85 || July 7 || @Giants || 0–3 || Matt Cain (1–1) || Bartolo Colón (9–7) || Santiago Casilla (21)  || AT&T Park (42,164) || 43–42
|-  style="text-align:center; background:#cfc"
| 86 || July 8 || @Giants || 4–1 || Jacob deGrom (9–6) || Jake Peavy (0–4) || Jeurys Familia (24)  || AT&T Park (41,914) || 44–42
|-  style="text-align:center; background:#cfc"
| 87 || July 10 || Diamondbacks || 4–2 || Noah Syndergaard (4–4) || Chase Anderson (4–3) || Jeurys Familia (25) || Citi Field (28,243) || 45–42
|-  style="text-align:center; background:#cfc"
| 88 || July 11 || Diamondbacks || 4–2 || Matt Harvey (8–6) || Patrick Corbin (1–1) || Jeurys Familia (26) || Citi Field (36,038) || 46–42
|-  style="text-align:center; background:#cfc"
| 89 || July 12 || Diamondbacks || 5–3 || Jon Niese (5–8) || Rubby De La Rosa (6–5) || Jeurys Familia (27) || Citi Field (28,259) || 47–42
|-  style="text-align:center; background:#bbbbbb"
|  || July 14 || A.L. @ N.L. || colspan=4| 2015 Major League Baseball All-Star Game || Great American Ball Park ||
|-  style="text-align:center; background:#fcc"
| 90 || July 17 || @Cardinals || 2–3 || Lance Lynn (7–5) || Noah Syndergaard (4–5) || Trevor Rosenthal (27) || Busch Stadium (44,540) || 47–43
|-  style="text-align:center; background:#fcc"
| 91 || July 18 || @Cardinals || 2–12 || John Lackey (8–5) || Bartolo Colón (9–8) ||  || Busch Stadium (45,852) || 47–44
|-  style="text-align:center; background:#cfc"
| 92 || July 19 || @Cardinals || 3–1 (18) || Carlos Torres (3–4)  || Carlos Martínez (10–4) ||  || Busch Stadium (43,194) || 48–44
|-  style="text-align:center; background:#fcc"
| 93 || July 20 || @Nationals || 2–7 || Gio González (7–4) || Matt Harvey (8–7) || || Nationals Park (31,326) || 48–45
|-  style="text-align:center; background:#cfc"
| 94 || July 21 || @Nationals || 7–2 || Jacob DeGrom (10–6) || Joe Ross (2–2) || || Nationals Park (37,721) || 49–45
|-  style="text-align:center; background:#fcc"
| 95 || July 22 || @Nationals || 3–4 || Matt Thornton (1–0) || Bobby Parnell (1–1)  || Drew Storen (29) || Nationals Park (41,291) || 49–46
|-  style="text-align:center; background:#fcc"
| 96 || July 23 || Dodgers || 0–3 || Clayton Kershaw (8–6) || Bartolo Colón (9–9) ||  || Citi Field (34,222) || 49–47
|-  style="text-align:center; background:#fcc"
| 97 || July 24 || Dodgers || 2–7 || Ian Thomas (1–1) || Jon Niese (5–9) ||  || Citi Field (36,066) || 49–48
|-  style="text-align:center; background:#cfc"
| 98 || July 25 || Dodgers || 15–2 || Matt Harvey (9–7) || Zach Lee (0–1) ||  || Citi Field (39,744) || 50–48
|-  style="text-align:center; background:#cfc"
| 99 || July 26 || Dodgers || 3–2 || Jenrry Mejía (1–0) || Juan Nicasio (1–3) ||  || Citi Field (36,093) || 51–48
|-  style="text-align:center; background:#cfc"
| 100 || July 28 || Padres || 4–0 || Noah Syndergaard (5–5) || James Shields (8–4) ||  || Citi Field (26,034) || 52–48
|-  style="text-align:center; background:#fcc"
| 101 || July 29 || Padres || 3–7 || Tyson Ross (7–8) || Bartolo Colón (9–10) ||  || Citi Field (24,804) || 52–49
|-  style="text-align:center; background:#fcc"
| 102 || July 30 || Padres || 7–8 || Marcos Mateo (1–0) || Jeurys Familia (2–1) || Craig Kimbrel (30) || Citi Field (35,604) || 52–50
|-  style="text-align:center; background:#cfc"
| 103 || July 31 || Nationals || 2–1 (12) || Carlos Torres (4–4) || Felipe Rivero (1–1) || || Citi Field (36,164) || 53–50
|-

|-  style="text-align:center; background:#cfc"
| 104 || August 1 || Nationals || 3–2 || Hansel Robles (3–2) || Matt Thornton (1–1) || Jeurys Familia (28) || Citi Field (42,996) || 54–50
|-  style="text-align:center; background:#cfc"
| 105 || August 2 || Nationals || 5–2 || Noah Syndergaard (6–5) || Jordan Zimmermann (8–7) || Tyler Clippard (18) || Citi Field (35,374) || 55–50
|-  style="text-align:center; background:#cfc"
| 106 || August 3 || @Marlins || 12–1 || Bartolo Colón (10–10)  || Tom Koehler (8–8) ||  || Marlins Park (23,119) || 56–50
|-  style="text-align:center; background:#cfc"
| 107 || August 4 || @Marlins || 5–1 || Jon Niese (6–9) || Mike Dunn (1–5)  ||  || Marlins Park (23,882) || 57–50
|-  style="text-align:center; background:#cfc"
| 108 || August 5 || @Marlins || 8–6  || Matt Harvey (10–7)  || David Phelps (4–8)  || Jeurys Familia (29)  || Marlins Park (25,897) || 58–50
|-  style="text-align:center; background:#cfc"
| 109 || August 7 || @Rays || 4–3 || Tyler Clippard (2–3)  || Brad Boxberger (4–8) || Jeurys Familia (30)  || Tropicana Field (23,145) || 59–50
|-  style="text-align:center; background:#fcc"
| 110 || August 8 || @Rays || 4–5  || Nathan Karns (7–5) || Noah Syndergaard (6–6) || Brad Boxberger (28)  || Tropicana Field (31,042) || 59–51
|-  style="text-align:center; background:#fcc"
| 111 || August 9 || @Rays || 3–4 || Xavier Cedeno (2–1)  || Bartolo Colón (10–11) || Jake McGee (6)  || Tropicana Field (26,681) || 59–52
|-  style="text-align:center; background:#cfc"
| 112 || August 10 || Rockies || 4–2 || Jon Niese (7–9) || Justin Miller (1–1) || Jeurys Familia (31) || Citi Field (27,194) || 60–52
|-  style="text-align:center; background:#cfc"
| 113 || August 11 || Rockies || 4–0 || Matt Harvey (11–7) || Chris Rusin (3–5) ||  || Citi Field (25,611) || 61–52
|-  style="text-align:center; background:#cfc"
| 114 || August 12 || Rockies || 3–0 || Jacob deGrom (11–6) || Jorge de la Rosa (7–5) || Jeurys Familia (32) || Citi Field (37,175) || 62–52
|-  style="text-align:center; background:#cfc"
| 115 || August 13 || Rockies || 12–3  || Noah Syndergaard (7–6) || Eddie Butler (3–10) ||  || Citi Field (36,573) || 63–52
|-  style="text-align:center; background:#fcc"
| 116 || August 14 || Pirates || 2–3 (10) || Arquimedes Caminero (3–1) || Bobby Parnell (1–2) || Mark Melancon (36) || Citi Field (38,495) || 63–53
|-  style="text-align:center; background:#fcc"
| 117 || August 15 || Pirates || 3–5 (14)|| Joe Blanton (4–2) || Sean Gilmartin (1–1) || Mark Melancon (37) || Citi Field (38,878) || 63–54
|-  style="text-align:center; background:#fcc"
| 118 || August 16 || Pirates || 1–8 || Arquimedes Caminero (4–1) || Bobby Parnell (1–3) ||  || Citi Field (40,250) || 63–55
|-  style="text-align:center; background:#cfc"
| 119 || August 18 || @Orioles || 5–3 || Jacob deGrom (12–6) || Kevin Gausman (2–5) || Jeurys Familia (33) || Oriole Park at Camden Yards (34,068) || 64–55
|-  style="text-align:center; background:#fcc"
| 120 || August 19 || @Orioles || 4–5 || Zach Britton (4–0) || Carlos Torres (4–5) ||  || Oriole Park at Camden Yards (36,165) || 64–56
|-  style="text-align:center; background:#cfc"
| 121 || August 21 || @Rockies || 14–9 || Sean Gilmartin (2–1) || Christian Friedrich (0–4) ||  || Coors Field (31,079) || 65–56
|-  style="text-align:center; background:#cfc"
| 122 || August 22 || @Rockies || 14–9 || Jon Niese (8–9) || Chris Rusin (4–6) ||  || Coors Field (46,170) || 66–56
|-  style="text-align:center; background:#cfc"
| 123 || August 23 || @Rockies || 5–1 || Logan Verrett (1–1) || David Hale (3–5) ||  || Coors Field (33,200) || 67–56
|-  style="text-align:center; background:#cfc"
| 124 || August 24 || @Phillies || 16–7 || Sean Gilmartin (3–1) || Héctor Neris (2–1) ||  || Citizens Bank Park (23,744) || 68–56
|-  style="text-align:center; background:#cfc"
| 125 || August 25 || @Phillies || 6–5 || Noah Syndergaard (8–6) || Jerome Williams (4–10) || Jeurys Familia (34) || Citizens Bank Park (23,544) || 69–56
|-  style="text-align:center; background:#cfc"
| 126 || August 26 || @Phillies || 9–4 || Bartolo Colón (11–11) || Jerad Eickhoff (1–1) || Tyler Clippard (19) || Citizens Bank Park (22,184) || 70–56
|-  style="text-align:center; background:#cfc"
| 127 || August 27 || @Phillies || 9–5 (13) || Carlos Torres (5–5) || Hectro Neris (2–2) ||  || Citizens Bank Park (22,526) || 71–56
|-  style="text-align:center; background:#fcc"
| 128 || August 28 || Red Sox || 4–6 (10) || Tommy Layne (1–1) || Carlos Torres (5–6) || Craig Breslow (1) || Citi Field (39,401) || 71–57
|-  style="text-align:center; background:#fcc"
| 129 || August 29 || Red Sox || 1–3 || Joe Kelly (8–6) || Jacob deGrom (12–7) || Jean Machi (3) || Citi Field (43,255) || 71–58
|-  style="text-align:center; background:#cfc"
| 130 || August 30 || Red Sox || 5–4 || Tyler Clippard (3–3) || Robbie Ross, Jr. (0–2) || Jeurys Familia (35) || Citi Field (38,938) || 72–58
|-  style="text-align:center; background:#cfc"
| 131 || August 31 || Phillies || 3–1 || Bartolo Colón (12–11) || Jared Eickhoff (1–2) || Jeurys Familia (36) || Citi Field (34,233) || 73–58
|-

|-  style="text-align:center; background:#fcc"
| 132 || September 1 || Phillies || 8–14 || Jeanmar Gómez (2–3) || Jon Niese (8–10) ||  || Citi Field (30,104) || 73–59
|-  style="text-align:center; background:#cfc"
| 133 || September 2 || Phillies || 9–4 || Matt Harvey (12–7) || Aaron Nola (5–2) ||  || Citi Field (32,464) || 74–59
|-  style="text-align:center; background:#fcc"
| 134 || September 4 || @Marlins || 5–6 (11) || Brian Ellington (1–0) || Erik Goeddel (0–1) ||  || Marlins Park (24,763) || 74–60
|-  style="text-align:center; background:#cfc"
| 135 || September 5 || @Marlins || 7–0 || Bartolo Colón (13–11) || Brad Hand (4–5) ||  || Marlins Park (23,135) || 75–60
|-  style="text-align:center; background:#fcc"
| 136 || September 6 || @Marlins || 3–4 || A.J. Ramos (2–4) || Tyler Clippard (3–4) ||  || Marlins Park (26,780) || 75–61
|-  style="text-align:center; background:#cfc"
| 137 || September 7 || @Nationals || 8–5 || Darío Álvarez (1–0) || Blake Treinen (2–3) || Jeurys Familia (37) || Nationals Park (34,210) || 76–61
|-  style="text-align:center; background:#cfc"
| 138 || September 8 || @Nationals || 8–7 || Addison Reed (3–2) || Jonathan Papelbon (3–2) || Jeurys Familia (38) || Nationals Park (27,507) || 77–61
|-  style="text-align:center; background:#cfc"
| 139 || September 9 || @Nationals || 5–3 || Jacob deGrom (13–7) || Stephen Strasburg (8–7) || Jeurys Familia (39) || Nationals Park (27,530) || 78–61
|-  style="text-align:center; background:#cfc"
| 140 || September 10 || @Braves ||7–2  ||Bartolo Colón (14–11)  || Shelby Miller (5–14)  ||  || Turner Field (22,640) || 79–61
|-  style="text-align:center; background:#cfc"
| 141 || September 11 || @Braves || 5–1 || Steven Matz (3–0) || Matt Wisler (5–7) ||  || Turner Field (23,216) || 80–61
|-  style="text-align:center; background:#cfc"
| 142 || September 12 || @Braves || 6–4 || Tyler Clippard (4–4) || Arodys Vizcaíno (2–1) || Jeurys Familia (40) || Turner Field (27,380) || 81–61
|-  style="text-align:center; background:#cfc"
| 143 || September 13 || @Braves || 10–7 (10) || Bobby Parnell (2–3) || Edwin Jackson (2–3) || Addison Reed (4) || Turner Field (23,786) || 82–61
|-  style="text-align:center; background:#cfc"
| 144 || September 14 || Marlins || 4–3 || Hansel Robles (4–2) || Kyle Barraclough (2–1) || Jeurys Familia (41) || Citi Field (27,320) || 83–61
|-  style="text-align:center; background:#fcc"
| 145 || September 15 || Marlins || 3–9 || Tom Koehler (10–13) || Jacob deGrom (13–8) ||  || Citi Field (25,633) || 83–62
|-  style="text-align:center; background:#fcc"
| 146 || September 16 || Marlins || 0–6 || Adam Conley (4–1) || Bartolo Colón (14–12) ||  || Citi Field (25,161) || 83–63
|-  style="text-align:center; background:#cfc"
| 147 || September 18 || Yankees || 5–1 || Steven Matz (4–0) || Masahiro Tanaka (12–7) ||  || Citi Field (43,602) || 84–63
|-  style="text-align:center; background:#fcc"
| 148 || September 19 || Yankees || 0–5 || Michael Pineda (11–8) || Noah Syndergaard (8–7) ||  || Citi Field (43,630) || 84–64
|-  style="text-align:center; background:#fcc"
| 149 || September 20 || Yankees || 2–11 || CC Sabathia (5–9) || Hansel Robles (4–3) ||  || Citi Field (43,571) || 84–65
|-  style="text-align:center; background:#cfc"
| 150 || September 21 || Braves || 4–0 || Jon Niese (9–10) || Shelby Miller (5–16) ||  || Citi Field (26,362) || 85–65
|-  style="text-align:center; background:#fcc"
| 151 || September 22 || Braves || 2–6 || Matt Wisler (6–8) || Logan Verrett (1–2) ||  || Citi Field (26,227) || 85–66
|-  style="text-align:center; background:#fcc"
| 152 || September 23 || Braves || 3–6 || Edwin Jackson (4–3) || Jeurys Familia (2–2) || Arodys Vizcaíno (7) || Citi Field (28,931) || 85–67
|-  style="text-align:center; background:#cfc"
| 153 || September 24 || @Reds || 6–4 || Erik Goeddel (1–1) || Manny Parra (1–2) || Jeurys Familia (42) || Great American Ball Park (18,881) || 86–67
|-  style="text-align:center; background:#cfc"
| 154 || September 25 || @Reds || 12–5 || Noah Syndergaard (9–7) || Anthony DeSclafani (9–12) ||  || Great American Ball Park (26,780) || 87–67
|-  style="text-align:center; background:#cfc"
| 155 || September 26 || @Reds || 10–2 || Matt Harvey (13–7) || Adam Lamb (1–4) || || Great American Ball Park (32,293) || 88–67
|-  style="text-align:center; background:#cfc"
| 156 || September 27 || @Reds || 8–1 || Jacob deGrom (14–8) || Keyvius Sampson (2–6) ||  || Great American Ball Park (24,621) || 89–67
|-  style="text-align:center; background:#fcc"
| 157 || September 29 || @Phillies || 3–4 || Adam Loewen (1–0) || Bartolo Colón (14–13) || Ken Giles (14) || Citizens Bank Park (15,227) || 89-68
|-  style="text-align:center; background:#fcc"
| 158 || September 30 || @Phillies || 5–7 || Ken Roberts (1–1) || Bobby Parnell (2–4) || Ken Giles (15) || Citizens Bank Park (15,201) || 89-69
|-

|-  style="text-align:center; background:#fcc"
| 159 || October 1 || @Phillies || 0–3 || Jerad Eickhoff (3–3) || Sean Gilmartin (3–2) || Luis García (2) || Citizens Bank Park (13,238) || 89–70
|-  style="text-align:center; background:#cccccc"
| || October 2 || Nationals || colspan=4| Postponed (rain); rescheduled for October 3 || Citi Field ||
|-  style="text-align:center; background:#fcc"
| 160 || October 3 || Nationals || 1–3 || Rafael Martin (2–0) || Addison Reed (3–3) || Felipe Rivero (2) || Citi Field (39,465) || 89–71
|-  style="text-align:center; background:#fcc"
| 161 || October 3 || Nationals || 0–2 || Max Scherzer (14–12) || Matt Harvey (13–8) ||  || Citi Field (41,480) || 89–72
|-  style="text-align:center; background:#cfc"
| 162 || October 4 || Nationals || 1–0 || Tyler Clippard (5–4) || Blake Treinen (2–5) || Jeurys Familia (43) || Citi Field (41,631) || 90–72
|-

Postseason

|-  style="text-align:center; background:#cfc"
| 1 || October 9 || @ Dodgers ||3–1 || Jacob deGrom (1–0) || Clayton Kershaw (0–1) || Jeurys Familia (1)  || Dodger Stadium (54,428) || 1–0
|-  style="text-align:center; background:#fcc"
| 2 || October 10 || @ Dodgers || 2–5 || Zack Greinke (1–0) || Noah Syndergaard (0–1) || Kenley Jansen (1) || Dodger Stadium (54,455) || 1–1 
|-  style="text-align:center; background:#cfc"
| 3 || October 12 || Dodgers || 13–7 || Matt Harvey (1–0) || Brett Anderson (0–1) ||  || Citi Field (44,276) || 2–1
|-  style="text-align:center; background:#fcc"
| 4 || October 13 || Dodgers || 1–3 || Clayton Kershaw (1–1) || Steven Matz (0–1) || Kenley Jansen (2) || Citi Field (44,183) || 2–2
|-  style="text-align:center; background:#cfc"
| 5 || October 15 || @ Dodgers || 3–2 || Jacob deGrom (2–0) || Zack Greinke (1–1) || Jeurys Familia (2) || Dodger Stadium (54,602) || 3–2
|-

|-  style="text-align:center; background:#cfc"
| 1 || October 17 || Cubs || 4–2 || Matt Harvey (2–0) || Jon Lester (0–2) || Jeurys Familia (3) || Citi Field (44,287) || 1–0
|-  style="text-align:center; background:#cfc"
| 2 || October 18 || Cubs || 4–1 || Noah Syndergaard (1–1) || Jake Arrieta (2–1) || Jeurys Familia (4) || Citi Field (44,502) || 2–0
|-  style="text-align:center; background:#cfc"
| 3 || October 20 || @ Cubs || 5–2 || Jacob deGrom (3–0) || Trevor Cahill (1–1) || Jeurys Familia (5) || Wrigley Field (42,231) || 3–0
|-  style="text-align:center; background:#cfc"
| 4 || October 21 || @ Cubs || 8–3 || Bartolo Colón (1–0) || Jason Hammel (0–1) ||  || Wrigley Field (42,227) || 4–0
|-

|-  style="text-align:center; background:#fcc"
| 1 || October 27 || @ Royals || 4–5 (14) || Chris Young (1–0) || Bartolo Colón (0–1) ||  || Kauffman Stadium (40,320) || 0–1
|-  style="text-align:center; background:#fcc"
| 2 || October 28 || @ Royals || 1–7 || Johnny Cueto (1–0) || Jacob deGrom (0–1) ||  || Kauffman Stadium (40,410) || 0–2
|-  style="text-align:center; background:#cfc"
| 3 || October 30 || Royals || 9–3 || Noah Syndergaard (1–0) || Yordano Ventura (0–1) ||  || Citi Field (44,781) || 1–2
|-  style="text-align:center; background:#fcc"
| 4 || October 31 || Royals || 3–5 || Ryan Madson (1–0) || Tyler Clippard (0–1) || Wade Davis (1) || Citi Field (44,815) || 1–3
|-  style="text-align:center; background:#fcc"
| 5 || November 1 || Royals || 2–7 (12)  ||Luke Hochevar (1-0)||Addison Reed (0-1)||  || Citi Field (44,859) || 1–4
|-

Postseason rosters

| style="text-align:left" |
Pitchers: 27 Jeurys Familia 32 Steven Matz 33 Matt Harvey 34 Noah Syndergaard 40 Bartolo Colón 43 Addison Reed 46 Tyler Clippard 47 Hansel Robles 48 Jacob deGrom 49 Jon Niese 62 Erik Goeddel
Catchers: 7 Travis d'Arnaud 22 Kevin Plawecki 
Infielders: 4 Wilmer Flores 5 David Wright 11 Rubén Tejada  21 Lucas Duda 28 Daniel Murphy 55 Kelly Johnson 56 Matt Reynolds 
Outfielders: 3 Curtis Granderson 9 Kirk Nieuwenhuis 12 Juan Lagares 23 Michael Cuddyer 30 Michael Conforto 52 Yoenis Céspedes 
|- valign="top"

| style="text-align:left" |
Pitchers: 27 Jeurys Familia 32 Steven Matz 33 Matt Harvey 34 Noah Syndergaard 36 Sean Gilmartin 40 Bartolo Colón 43 Addison Reed 46 Tyler Clippard 47 Hansel Robles 48 Jacob deGrom 49 Jon Niese
Catchers: 7 Travis d'Arnaud 22 Kevin Plawecki
Infielders: 4 Wilmer Flores 5 David Wright 21 Lucas Duda 28 Daniel Murphy 55 Kelly Johnson 56 Matt Reynolds
Outfielders: 3 Curtis Granderson 9 Kirk Nieuwenhuis 12 Juan Lagares 23 Michael Cuddyer 30 Michael Conforto 52 Yoenis Céspedes 
|- valign="top"

| style="text-align:left" |
Pitchers: 27 Jeurys Familia 32 Steven Matz 33 Matt Harvey 34 Noah Syndergaard 36 Sean Gilmartin 40 Bartolo Colón 43 Addison Reed 46 Tyler Clippard 47 Hansel Robles 48 Jacob deGrom 49 Jon Niese
Catchers: 7 Travis d'Arnaud 22 Kevin Plawecki
Infielders: 2 Juan Uribe 4 Wilmer Flores 5 David Wright 21 Lucas Duda 28 Daniel Murphy 55 Kelly Johnson
Outfielders: 3 Curtis Granderson 9 Kirk Nieuwenhuis 12 Juan Lagares 23 Michael Cuddyer 30 Michael Conforto 52 Yoenis Céspedes 
|- valign="top"

Roster

Player stats

Batting

Regular season
Players bolded are presently on Mets active roster.
Note: G = Games played; AB = At bats; R = Runs scored; H = Hits; 2B = Doubles; 3B = Triples; HR = Home runs; RBI = Runs batted in; SB = Stolen bases; BB = Base on balls; K = Strikeouts; AVG = Batting average

Postseason
Players bolded are presently on Mets active roster.
Note: G = Games played; AB = At bats; R = Runs scored; H = Hits; 2B = Doubles; 3B = Triples; HR = Home runs; RBI = Runs batted in; SB = Stolen bases; BB = Base on balls; K = Strikeouts; AVG = Batting average

Pitching
Players bolded are currently on the Mets active roster.  
Note: G = Games pitched; GS = Games started; W = Wins; L = Losses; SV = Saves; IP = Innings pitched; H = Hits allowed; R = Runs allowed; ER = Earned runs allowed; BB = Walks allowed; K = Strikeouts; ERA = Earned run average;

Farm system

References

External links

2015 New York Mets season Official Site
2015 New York Mets season at Baseball Reference
2015 New York Mets season at ESPN

New York Mets seasons
New York Mets season
New York Mets
National League champion seasons
National League East champion seasons
2010s in Queens
Flushing, Queens